The DC Animated Universe (DCAU, also referred to as the Timmverse or Diniverse by fans) is a shared universe centered on a group of animated television series based on DC Comics and produced by Warner Bros. Animation. It began with Batman: The Animated Series in 1992 and ended with Justice League Unlimited in 2006. Animated feature films and shorts, comic books, video games, and other multimedia adaptations are also in the continuity.

List of DC Animated Universe media 

While there are many animated projects based upon DC Comics characters, the DC Animated Universe consists of TV series and films that spin off from Batman: The Animated Series. Two characters outside of the normal Batman canon, Zatanna and Jonah Hex, appeared on the series, but the first series to indicate a shared continuity with other well-known characters was Superman: The Animated Series, in which the title character encounters heroes such as Batman, the Wally West version of Flash, the Green Lantern Kyle Rayner, Aquaman, and Doctor Fate.

The DCAU also includes tie-in materials such as comic books, video games, and direct-to video films with a similar animation style; however, their canonicity is disputable. While they are often marketed as being part of the DCAU, some of these works have contradictory elements or are written by a different team. For example, the 2006 direct-to-video feature film Superman: Brainiac Attacks, has been stated by writer Duane Capizzi to not be a part of the DCAU, despite using the same animation style and many voice actors from Superman: The Animated Series.

The direct-to-video DC Universe Animated Original Movies are also not part of the DCAU, despite some utilizing similar character designs and voice actors. The 2017 film Batman and Harley Quinn features the animation style of The New Batman Adventures, though co-writer Jim Krieg has stated that the film is DCAU adjacent, due to it being more comedic and raunchy. The 2019 film Justice League vs. the Fatal Five was done in the style of Justice League Unlimited, but the film's canonicity is considered open-ended. Bruce Timm has stated the film is set within the DCAU after JLU; however, Timm has also mentioned in the audio commentary of the film that it may cause some continuity issues. Ultimately, Timm stated that fans could decide its canonicity on their own.

Television series 
The DC Animated Universe consists of the following animated television series:

Feature films 
The DCAU continuity also includes the following feature films:

Short films

Digital series

Cancelled projects
An animated series based on the Teen Titans comic books was planned for the DC Animated Universe during the mid-1990s, but was ultimately scrapped, however the team was confirmed to exist in the universe in the Static Shock (which was also not initially intended to be part of the DCAU until the second season) episode "Hard as Nails" with Robin confirmed to be a member by Batman. Instead a Teen Titans series not related to the DC animated universe was released. Also, after the success of Batman: The Animated Series in the early 1990s, Fox approached producer Bruce Timm to create a spin-off series focusing on Catwoman, but the project never materialized.

In 1998, writer John P. McCann had been tasked with coming up with a Lobo animated series in the DC Animated Universe, with Brad Garrett set to reprise his role as the character, but the show had been cancelled right before production. A few elements of the show would find its way in the 2000 Lobo webseries, an online Flash animated series starring Lobo, the galactic bounty hunter, however whether the webseries is part of the official DCAU is unclear. A wax statue with the same character design as Lobo in this series appeared in an episode of Gotham Girls which somewhat support that the webseries is part of the official DCAU, although this is still disputed. Unlike the other shows set in the DCAU, it has graphic violence, sexual content, strong profanity, and a lack of tie-ins with the greater DCAU.

Before the release of Batman Beyond: Return of the Joker, a third animated feature based on Batman: The Animated Series was planned, entitled Batman: Arkham. The film was supposed to be a follow-up for Batman & Mr. Freeze: SubZero, and Boyd Kirkland was attached to write and direct; but the project was soon scrapped. A second Batman Beyond movie was planned for release but was finally scrapped due to the dark tones and controversies of Return of the Joker in 2001. Around 2003, during the production of Batman: Mystery of the Batwoman, Warner Bros. approached Kirkland to write a Catwoman direct-to-video feature film as a tie-in with the 2004 live-action film. Although the script was written, the project was soon scrapped after the poor reception of the live-action film.

Also, a direct-to-video feature-length animated film entitled Justice League: Worlds Collide was planned to connect Justice League with its follow-up Justice League Unlimited, but the production was finally cancelled in 2004, and the script was later rewritten for the animated film Justice League: Crisis on Two Earths, removing all connections to the DCAU.

Comic books 

Many of the DCAU productions have also had comic books created based on the characters of the various series, though their canonicity is disputable. The comics are:

Recurring cast and characters

The future of the DCAU 
With the conclusion of the Justice League Unlimited animated series, Warner Bros has moved on to producing standalone films based on the various DC comics properties rather than reviving the DCAU counterparts.

The last script written for DCAU continuity was titled Justice League: Worlds Collide. This screenplay was created to bridge the several month gap between Justice League and Justice League Unlimited. The draft was eventually adapted into the February 2010 film Justice League: Crisis on Two Earths, with the removal of any references specific to DCAU continuity, replacing Green Lantern John Stewart with Hal Jordan, and the casting of different voice actors than those of the DCAU.

In 2009, Bruce Timm was asked at a ToonZone forum if the DCAU will return in the future, and he stated this:

On June 8, 2015, during an interview with Nerdist about his new film Justice League: Gods and Monsters, Bruce Timm was asked if the DC Animated Universe will return someday. Although Timm stated that the DCAU continuity was unlikely to return, the possibility always exists.

In 2018, Kevin Conroy said work on the DCAU had stalled because the writers ran out of ideas for stories and believed stopping was best, as they did not want to "compromise on the quality of what they had and start creating kind of silly stories".

In Space Jam: A New Legacy (2021), multiple characters from DCAU appears in the film in non-vocal appearances.  These characters include Aquaman, Batgirl, The Flash, James Gordon, Dick Grayson, Clark Kent / Superman, Selina Kyle, Lois Lane, Jimmy Olsen, Alfred Pennyworth, Harleen Quinzel, John Stewart, Arnold Wesker and Perry White.

The cast of Justice League has been vocal about wanting a revival of the series, while Bruce Timm has said he would return as well if they were asked.

An audio revival of Batman: The Animated Series is in development with Alan Burnett, and others returning. Conroy was also set to return prior to his death in 2022.

Comics 
The Batman Beyond comic series is a loose adaptation of the Batman Beyond franchise, intended to fit the character and storylines from the series into the mainstream DC continuity. The miniseries began in June 2010, under the title Future Evil. In August 2010, the series was announced to continue following the completion of the first arc as an ongoing series. That series concluded alongside the entire line of ongoing monthly DC Comics superhero books during the 2011 revamp and relaunch, titled The New 52.

Superman Beyond, a one-shot comic set in the same universe as Batman Beyond, was released in 2011.

Batman Beyond Unlimited, a title chronicling the adventures of the future Justice League introduced in the DCAU, was released in February 2012. This series published monthly triple-sized issues, containing three stories of Terry McGinnis, Clark "Cal" Kent, and the future Justice League Unlimited, respectively.

Batman Beyond Universe succeeded Unlimited in August 2013, condensing to double-monthly issues upon the elderly Superman's rejoining the future Justice League.

Terry McGinnis was the central figure in The New 52: Futures End weekly series.

In 2015–2016, DC Comics and IDW Publishing released a jointly produced, six-issue miniseries comic titled Batman/TMNT, where the New 52 Batman encounters the IDW incarnation of the Teenage Mutant Ninja Turtles. The success of this miniseries inspired a similar crossover story, with Batman's DCAU incarnation meeting the Amazing Adventures comic version of the 2012 CGI series' Turtles. Titled Batman/TMNT Adventures, the concept was first announced in late July 2016 and scheduled for a six-issue release starting November 9, 2016.

A comic book continuation of seven-issues of Justice League Unlimited, called Justice League Infinity, was released monthly between July 2021 and January 2022; the series is set after the show's finale and explores the consequences of Darkseid's disappearance and the League clashing with alternate versions of themselves within the Multiverse.

Outside media

Video games 
There have also been a number of DCAU tie-in video games released to correspond with the various animated television series and films. Some of these games have original plots, while others follow previous stories; their status in DCAU canon is unknown. The games are:

Six of these games feature voice acting from the casts of the original shows. These are: The Adventures of Batman and Robin (SEGA CD/Mega CD version), Superman, Batman Vengeance, Superman: Shadow of Apokolips, Batman: Rise of Sin Tzu, and View-Master Batman Animated VR. The SEGA CD/Mega CD game, The Adventures of Batman and Robin, also features animation from one of the studios that worked on Batman: The Animated Series.

The Heart of Batman 
A 90-minute documentary film was released on October 16, 2018, as part of the Batman: The Complete Animated Series Deluxe Limited Edition and Batman: The Complete Animated Series Blu-ray/Digital box set, and was later made available on the official Warner Bros. Entertainment YouTube channel.

Crossovers, adaptations, and references

TV series

Comics

Characters adapted from the DCAU 

Though the DCAU is an offshoot of the mainstream DC comics universe, it has also affected the DC universe in return. The following characters were originally created for their respective series in the DCAU, but were eventually adapted via retroactive continuity into the mainstream DC comic continuity:

 Nora Fries (Batman: The Animated Series)
 Harley Quinn (Batman: The Animated Series)
 Renee Montoya (Batman: The Animated Series)
 Lock-Up (Batman: The Animated Series)
 Sewer King (Batman: The Animated Series)
 The Condiment King (Batman: The Animated Series)
 Mercy Graves (Superman: The Animated Series)
 Livewire (Superman: The Animated Series)
 Roxy Rocket (The New Batman Adventures)
 Terry McGinnis/Batman (Batman Beyond)
 Gray Ghost (Batman: The Animated Series)
Phantasm (Batman: Mask of the Phantasm)
 Blight (Batman Beyond)

In addition, the backstory of Mr. Freeze was adapted from his portrayal in Batman: The Animated Series, and the visuals and/or characterization of Green Lantern, Supergirl, Toyman, Two-Face, Parasite, Metallo, Clayface, and many others have been applied to their comic counterparts. On a different note, issue #22 of DC Comics' Superman/Batman series, which explores alternate realities, had Bizarro transported to an alternate version of Gotham City that was patrolled by a Batman using the Batman Beyond version of the costume. A version of the future of Batman Beyond made an appearance in Countdown to Final Crisis #21, as part of the new Multiverse in the wake of the Infinite Crisis and 52 series, and a Batman Beyond series had been planned. In January 2015, DC published The Multiversity Guidebook which revealed a universe inspired by the DCAU is Earth-12 in the DC Multiverse, and currently in the Batman Beyond era, while the Justice Lords Earth from those Batman Beyond comics has also been added to the canon as Earth-50.

See also 
 DC Animated Movie Universe
 DC Extended Universe
 Arrowverse

References

External links 
 World's Finest

 
DC Comics franchises
Television franchises
Fictional universes
Continuity (fiction)
Mass media franchises introduced in 1992
Mythopoeia